The Florence–Rome high-speed railway line is a link in the Italian high-speed rail network. It is known as the ferrovia direttissima Firenze-Roma in Italian—meaning "most direct Florence–Rome railway" (abbreviated DD); this name reflects the naming of the Rome–Formia–Naples Direttissima opened in 1927 and the Bologna–Florence Direttissima opened in 1934. The line was the first high-speed line opened in Europe when more than half of it opened on 24 February 1977. It was completed on 26 May 1992, reducing the time of the fastest trains between the two cities to 1 hour and 20 minutes. The old line is referred to by Ferrovie dello Stato (the State Railways) as the Linea Lenta (meaning "slow line", abbreviated LL) to distinguish it from the parallel high-speed line.

In 2016 a contract was let for resignalling with ETCS level 2. The line is part of Corridor 1 of the European Union's Trans-European high-speed rail network, which connects Berlin and Palermo.

History

The  railway between Rome and Florence developed from several different lines by several different companies for different purposes and as a result was curvy and slow. Over the years there had been many studies, proposals and projects for deviations to straighten the line but nothing came of them. After World War II it was finally decided to build a new line that was straighter, faster and especially shorter than the old Florence-Rome line; it was also to be well-integrated with the existing line, rather than replace it. The project was approved and funded in late 1968 and early 1969. This was the first high-speed rail project—in the sense that "high-speed" is now used—to be commenced in Europe.

On 25 June 1970 work began on the most important element of the project: the  Paglia viaduct over the Paglia river, which is made up of 205  linear spans of and five 50 metre-long arched spans and is the longest viaduct in Europe. It was expected that the first  section of the line from Roma Termini to Città della Pieve would take five years to complete, but it was not in fact opened until 24 February 1977. It was a milestone in the history of Italian railways, but progress was subsequently slowed by numerous obstacles, some of a political nature. The line had to be rerouted near Arezzo due to problems in driving a tunnel. The official opening took place with a train consisting of an FS Class E444 locomotive and Gran Comfort coaches.

The  section of line between Città della Pieve and Arezzo was completed on 29 September 1985; the  section between Valdarno and Florence was opened on 30 May 1986 and finally on 26 May 1992 the  section between Arezzo and Valdarno was opened.

Route

The line has a largely straight path with a maximum grade of 0.8%, no level crossings or intersections of any kind with road or rail traffic, and the centre of tracks four meters apart to counteract the dynamic effects created by trains passing each other. Communication with drivers consists of an adaptation of the Italian RS4 Codici train protection system with in-cabin repetition of signals using nine codes and earth to train telephone communication. Connections between the two tracks in both directions every  allow trains to use either track in either direction or for all operations to operate on a single track if necessary.

The interconnections between the high-speed lines and the old Florence–Bologna lines are implemented through grade-separated crossings above or below the line rather than crossing over the opposing track on the level. The line is electrified at 3 kV DC, and supplied by substations at  intervals. A contract was let to Ansaldo STS to replace the signalling and train protection system with ETCS level 2 in October 2016. It has been proposed to re-electrify the line at 25 kV AC in the past but this has been abandoned. 

On 28th of December 2020, ERTMS Level 2 was activated on the section between PM Rovezzano - Arezzo South interconnession. This was the first phase of the adjustment plan to AV/AC (High Speed/High Capacity) standards proposed by RFI.

See also
 List of railway lines in Italy
 Bologna–Florence high-speed railway

References

Footnotes

Sources

122 km de Direttissima - pp. 6-14 + pp. 39-43 - 26 photo - vie du rail n°1584 - 13/03/1977

High-speed railway lines in Italy
Railway lines in Lazio
Railway lines in Tuscany
Railway lines in Umbria
Railway lines opened in 1977
1977 establishments in Italy